We're Talkin' Serious Money (1992), also known as Serious Money, is an action comedy film  directed by James Lemmo. He also co-wrote the screenplay with Leo Rossi, who also stars in the film. Cinematography by Jacques Haitkin. It also stars: Dennis Farina, Fran Drescher, John LaMotta, Peter Iacangelo. It was produced by: Lisa M. Hansen, Harold Welb, Paul Hertzberg, who makes a small cameo in the film, Catalaine Knell, Guy J. Louthan, co-star Leo Rossi, and Harold Welb. The movie was filmed in Los Angeles, California, and New York City, New York. It was released by Grey Matter Entertainment and CineTel Films in the United States.

Plot
Two misfit men, Sal (Dennis Farina) and his friend Charlie (Leo Rossi), are cheated out of $10,000 that they had borrowed from a Mafia kingpin. They must flee from New York to Los Angeles, only to there get involved in a caper involving a video of Senators in compromising positions. Given a cool million for the video, they are then pursued by the mob and the FBI.

Cast
 Dennis Farina as Sal
 Leo Rossi as Charlie
 Fran Drescher as Valerie
 Cynthia Frost as Connie
 John LaMotta as Gino 'The Grocer'
 Peter Iacangelo as Frankie 'The Beast'
 Anthony Powers as Joey 'Eggs'
 Lou Bonacki as Cop #1
 John Cade as Cop #2
 Catherine Paolone as Rosemarie
 Robert Costanzo as Michael
 Denis Arndt as Jacubick
 John Josef Spencer as Rosemarie's Son
 Maria Cavaiani as Rosemarie's Daughter
 Len Pera as Goon Behind The Counter
 Donna Hardy as Old Lady (as Dona Hardy)

Production credits
 James Lemmo - Director / Screenwriter
 Lisa Hansen  – Producer
 Paul Hertzberg  – Producer
 Catalaine Knell  – Producer
 Guy J. Louthan  – Producer
 Leo Rossi  - Screenwriter / Producer
 Harold Welb  – Producer
 Jacques Haitkin  – Cinematographer
 Steve Nevius  – Editor
 Susan Benjamin  - Art Director
 Tom McKinley  - Costume Designer

Availability

The movie was released on videocassette in 1992 by Columbia TriStar Home Video. The movie has never been released on DVD, and as of December 26, 2009, Sony Pictures Home Entertainment has not yet announced any plans for a DVD release.

External links

1991 films
1991 action comedy films
1990s English-language films
CineTel Films films
American action comedy films
Films directed by James Lemmo
1990s American films